Stephanie Gray Chang is an American politician and a Democratic member of the Michigan Senate, representing the 3rd district. She previously served in the Michigan House of Representatives in the 6th District, in the Michigan House of Representatives after being elected in November 2014. She is the first Asian American woman to serve in the Michigan Legislature. She was the first woman to give birth while serving as a Michigan State Senator.

Early life and education
Chang was born at Sinai-Grace Hospital in Detroit. She was raised with her older sister, Josephina, in Canton, Michigan and is the daughter of parents who emigrated from Taiwan to pursue work in the auto industry.

In 2005, Chang graduated from the University of Michigan with a bachelor's in psychology and a minor in Asian/Pacific Islander American Studies. In May 2014, she received a master's in public policy and a master's in social work at the University of Michigan. While at the Gerald R. Ford School of Public Policy at the University of Michigan, Chang was a David Bohnett Leadership Fellow, interning at the Detroit mayor's office, as a paid intern via the David Bohnett Foundation.

Career

Community activism
Before her election, Chang worked for about a decade as a community organizer in Detroit. During that time, she worked for NextGen Climate Michigan as the state director, Center for Progressive Leadership in Michigan as the alumni engagement and evaluation coordinator, the James and Grace Lee Boggs School as the community engagement coordinator, the Campaign for Justice as deputy director, Michigan United as an organizer, and as an assistant to Grace Lee Boggs. She is also a co-founder and past president of Asian and Pacific Islander American Vote-Michigan and previously a mentor with the Detroit Asian Youth Project. She also co-founded and is a board member for Rising Voices of Asian American Families. She is a board member of the Southwest Detroit Community Justice Center.

Politics 
Chang became the State Representative for Michigan's House District 6 in January 2015. In her first term, she served on the Committees on Criminal Justice, Education, and Judiciary. In her second term, she served on the Committees on Education Reform, Law and Justice (where she serves as Minority Vice Chair), and Natural Resources.

Much of her legislative work is focused on air quality, affordable and safe drinking water, education and criminal justice reforms.

She was the chair of the Progressive Women's Caucus, a founding member of the Asian Pacific American Legislative Caucus, and a member of the Detroit Caucus, Michigan Democratic Latino Legislative Caucus and Michigan Legislative Black Caucus. She also served on the federal Environmental Protection Agency's Local Government Advisory Committee, which provides advice and recommendations to the EPA administrator to help develop strong partnerships with local governments to deliver environmental services and programs. Chang also focuses much of her work with residents in the district with the Mary Turner Center for Advocacy, the Neighborhood Service Center, ranging from saving homes from tax foreclosure to hosting a community baby shower for low-income pregnant women. In 2016 she launched the Girls Making Change fellowship, a leadership program for high school girls of color in District 6.

Chang faced Bettie Cook Scott in a Democratic Party primary for Michigan Senate District 1 on August 7, 2018, winning 49% to Cook Scott's 11%. During the election, Cook Scott made racially charged comments about Chang, referring to her as "ching-chang" and "the ching-chong", but later issued an apology through a representative.

Chang currently serves as State Senator for District 1 and as the Minority Floor Leader in the State Senate. She is the Minority Vice Chair for the Committee on Judiciary and Public Safety and for the Committee on Finance.

She has passed legislation related to female genital mutilation, criminal justice reform, nitrous oxide "Whippits," business improvement zones, domestic violence, and reentry services for exonerees.

Personal life 
Chang and her husband, Sean Gray, live in Detroit with their two young daughters.

References

External links
 
 Campaign website

American politicians of Taiwanese descent
American women of Taiwanese descent in politics
Living people
Democratic Party members of the Michigan House of Representatives
Democratic Party Michigan state senators
Politicians from Detroit
University of Michigan College of Literature, Science, and the Arts alumni
Women state legislators in Michigan
21st-century American politicians
21st-century American women politicians
Year of birth missing (living people)
University of Michigan School of Social Work alumni
Gerald R. Ford School of Public Policy alumni
Asian-American people in Michigan politics